Plimoth Patuxet is a complex of living history museums in Plymouth, Massachusetts founded in 1947, formerly Plimoth Plantation. It replicates the original settlement of the Plymouth Colony established in the 17th century by the English colonists who became known as the Pilgrims, as well as that of the Patuxet people upon whose land the Pilgrims settled. They were among the first people who emigrated to America to seek religious separation from the Church of England. It is a not-for-profit museum supported by administrations, contributions, grants, and volunteers. The recreations are based upon a wide variety of first-hand and second-hand records, accounts, articles, and period paintings and artifacts, and the museum conducts ongoing research and scholarship, including historical archaeological excavation and curation locally and abroad. 

In the English Village section of the museum, trained first-person ("historical") interpreters speak, act, and dress appropriately for the period, interacting with visitors by answering questions, discussing their lives and viewpoints, and participating in tasks such as cooking, planting, and animal husbandry. Third-person ("modern") interpreters answer guests' questions that the first-person interpreters cannot. The English Village represents the year 1627 through most of the museum season (which lasts from early April to late November), depicting day-to-day life and seasonal activities. In November, the English Village typically represents the year 1621, which is the year of the first Thanksgiving to take place in Plymouth Colony.

History 

Henry Hornblower II started the museum in 1947 with help and support from friends, family, and business associates as two English cottages and a fort on Plymouth's waterfront. Since then, the museum has grown to include a Mayflower II replica (1957), the English Village (1959), the Wampanoag Homesite (1973), the Hornblower Visitor Center (1987), the Craft Center (1992), the Maxwell and Nye Barns (1994), and the Plimoth Grist Mill (2013). Alongside the settlement is a recreation of a Wampanoag home site, where Indians from a variety of tribes explain and demonstrate how the Wampanoags' ancestors lived.

The museum grounds at Plimoth Patuxet also include Nye Barn where historical breeds of livestock are kept, a crafts center where many objects are created for use in the village exhibits, a cinema where educational videos are shown, a Colonial Education site for youth and adult groups, and a visitors' center with indoor exhibits and educational programs. The two houses on the Colonial Education site were built for the PBS show Colonial House, which was filmed in Maine. Following the filming, the museum disassembled the houses and reconstructed them at on their current site. The roof of the Cooke House was destroyed by a fire from a fireplace on November 19, 2011, and the building had to be demolished.

Mayflower II is docked near Plymouth Rock and is also under the care of the museum. Museum employees in modern dress interpret history to guests from a third-person perspective.

Name change
In July 2020, officials announced that the museum would be renamed, noting that their plan "for some time, has been to announce a new name for the Museum later this year as we commemorate the 400th anniversary (1620–2020) of the Pilgrims' arrival on the shores of historic Patuxet." It coincided with a wave of name changes that year meant to be more inclusive. Officials stated that discussions had been ongoing for more than a year to assess whether the existing name reflected "the full, multivalent history that is at the core of the museum’s mission." While a new name was not yet revealed, the museum began using a new logo that read "Plimoth Patuxet" instead of "Plimoth Plantation."

Images

Notes

External links
Plimoth Patuxet Museums
 "Writings of William Bradford" from C-SPAN's American Writers: A Journey Through History, broadcast from Plimoth Plantation, March 19, 2001

1947 establishments in Massachusetts
English colonization of the Americas
Native American museums in Massachusetts
Living museums in Massachusetts
Open-air museums in Massachusetts
Museums established in 1947
Museums in Plymouth, Massachusetts
Plymouth Colony
Wampanoag